Polanie II , also known as KnightShift and Once Upon a Knight, is a real-time strategy and role-playing video game hybrid developed by Reality Pump Studios and released by Topware Interactive for the PC Windows and OS X in 2003. The game is a follow-up to  Polanie, published by USER in 1996. KnightShift (Director's Cut Special Edition) was released for Windows later in 2003.

Gameplay

Plot

Legacy
A sequel, Polanie 3 or KnightShift 2: Curse of Souls, was announced in 2004. A playable demo was already available in 2004, with plans for a release in 2005. It was supposed to be a computer rpg-type game, abandoning its real-time strategy roots. The game was supposed to be available for the PC, PlayStation 3 and Xbox 360 platforms. The game was never released under that name. However, it eventually lost all of its RTS elements and morphed into a computer role-playing game released in 2007 as Two Worlds.

References

External links 
 
 Knightshift and Knightshift Special Edition at MobyGames

2003 video games
MacOS games
Real-time strategy video games
Video games developed in Poland
Windows games
Video games based on Slavic mythology
Video games set in Poland
TopWare Interactive games